Maalhendhoo (Dhivehi: މާޅެންދޫ) is one of the inhabited islands of Noonu Atoll.

Geography

Demography

References

Islands of the Maldives